The maritime shrew (Sorex maritimensis) is a species of mammal in the family Soricidae. It is found in New Brunswick and Nova Scotia in Canada.

References

Sorex
Mammals described in 1939
Mammals of Canada
Endemic fauna of Canada